EICA may refer to:

 Electrical Instrumentation Control Automation Engineering
 Connemara Airport in Ireland
 Edinburgh International Climbing Arena, indoor climbing arena near Edinburgh